The National Cricket League One-Day was the principal domestic limited overs cricket competition in Bangladesh from 2000–01 until 2010–11. It has since been superseded by the Dhaka Premier Division competition, which gained List A status in 2013.

One-Day Cricket League Winners
 2000–01 – Biman Bangladeshi Airlines (1/1)
 2001–02 – Sylhet Division (1/1)
 2002–03 – Khulna Division (1/1)
 2003–04 – Chittagong Division (1/1)
 2004–05 – Rajshahi Division (1/3)
 2005–06 – Rajshahi Division (2/2)
 2006–07 – Dhaka Division (1/2)
 2007–08 – Rajshahi Division (3/3)
 2008–09 – Barisal Division (1/1)
 2010–11 – Dhaka Division (2/2)

External links
 CricInfo review

References
 Wisden Cricketers Almanack (annual)

Bangladesh National Cricket League